Nureddin Nebati (born 1 January 1964; Şanlıurfa, Viranşehir), is a Turkish politician currently serving as the Minister of Finance and Treasury of Turkey. He has previously served in the Grand National Assembly as a member of Justice and Development Party. Nebati was appointed by Recep Tayyip Erdoğan on 2 December 2021, after the former Minister of Finance Lütfi Elvan resigned from the position.

Early life and education 
Nebati is of Arab origin, belonging to the tribe of Na'im. He was born to Süleyman and Emine Nebati and on 1 January 1964 in Viranşehir, a district of Şanlıurfa Province. He majored in political science and public administration at Istanbul University. Later, he completed his postgraduate education on international relations at Istanbul University's Social Science Department. Nebati has a doctorate degree from Kocaeli University.

Career

Personal life 
Nebati is married and has 4 children.

References 

Living people
1964 births
People from Viranşehir
Turkish people of Arab descent
Istanbul University alumni
Kocaeli University alumni
Justice and Development Party (Turkey) politicians